Dungeon Lords is a fantasy-themed euro-style board game with focus on resource management for 2-4 players, released in 2009. It was designed by Vlaada Chvátil.

Each player is a lord competing with other players to build a dungeon with rooms and traps, and defending against invaders.

See also
Dungeon Keeper

References

External links 
 

Board games introduced in 2009
Worker placement board games
Fantasy board games